The Oxford Dictionary of English Etymology is an etymological dictionary of the English language, published by Oxford University Press. The first editor of the dictionary was Charles Talbut Onions, who spent his last twenty years largely devoted to completing the first edition, published in 1966, which treated over 38,000 words and went to press just before his death.

Editions
C. T. Onions, ed.; edited by C. T. Onions with the assistance of G. W. S. Friedrichsen and R. W. Burchfield (1966, reprinted 1983, 1992, 1994) 

Also published by OUP:

The Concise Oxford Dictionary of English language
T. F. Hoad (1986)
T. F. Hoad (1993) 
An Etymological Dictionary of the English Language
W. W. Skeat (1910; reprint 1963; now in the public domain)

See also
 Oxford English Dictionary
Onions (ed.) - The Oxford Dictionary of English Etymology (1966) : Allan R. Bomhard : Free Download, Borrow, and Streaming : Internet Archive

References

1966 non-fiction books
Etymological dictionaries
English Etymology
English etymology
English dictionaries